Joke (pronounced ) is a Dutch feminine given name. It is a diminutive of Jo and a short form of Johanna.

Joke van Beusekom (born 1952), Dutch badminton player
Joke Bijleveld (born 1940), Dutch track and field athlete
Joke Bouwstra (born 1956), Dutch skin researcher
Joke Devynck (born 1972), Belgian actress
Joke Dierdorp (born 1955), Dutch rower
Joke Fincioen, American filmmaker and TV producer
Joke Kersten (1944-2020), Dutch politician
Joke Kleijweg (born 1962), Dutch long-distance runner
Joke de Korte (born 1935), Dutch swimmer
Joke van der Leeuw-Roord (born 1949), Dutch historian
Joke van Leeuwen (born 1952), Dutch author, illustrator, and cabaret performer
Joke Muyiwa, Nigerian film actress 
Joke Schauvliege (born 1970), Flemish politician
Joke Silva (born 1961), Nigerian actress, director, and businesswoman
Joke Smit (1933–1981), Dutch feminist and politician
Joke Waller-Hunter (1946-2005), Dutch UN official

See also
Joke Jay, German electronic DJ and artist

References

Dutch feminine given names